In mathematics, Abel's theorem for power series relates a limit of a power series to the sum of its coefficients.  It is named after Norwegian mathematician Niels Henrik Abel.

Theorem

Let the Taylor series

be a power series with real coefficients  with radius of convergence   Suppose that the series 
 
converges. 
Then  is continuous from the left at  that is,

The same theorem holds for complex power series 
 
provided that  entirely within a single Stolz sector, that is, a region of the open unit disk where

for some fixed finite .  Without this restriction, the limit may fail to exist: for example, the power series

Abel's theorem allows us to say more, namely that  is continuous on

Remarks

As an immediate consequence of this theorem, if  is any nonzero complex number for which the series 
 
converges, then it follows that

in which the limit is taken from below.

The theorem can also be generalized to account for sums which diverge to infinity. If

then 
 

However, if the series is only known to be divergent, but for reasons other than diverging to infinity, then the claim of the theorem may fail: take, for example, the power series for 

At  the series is equal to  but 

We also remark the theorem holds for radii of convergence other than : let 
 
be a power series with radius of convergence  and suppose the series converges at  Then  is continuous from the left at  that is,

Applications

See for example, the binomial series. Abel's theorem allows us to evaluate many series in closed form. For example, when 

we obtain 
 
 
Similarly, 
 
converges to 

 is called the generating function of the sequence  Abel's theorem is frequently useful in dealing with generating functions of real-valued and non-negative sequences, such as probability-generating functions. In particular, it is useful in the theory of Galton–Watson processes.

Outline of proof

After subtracting a constant from  we may assume that  Let  Then substituting  and performing a simple manipulation of the series (summation by parts) results in

Given  pick  large enough so that  for all  and note that

when  lies within the given Stolz angle. Whenever  is sufficiently close to  we have

Related concepts

Converses to a theorem like Abel's are called Tauberian theorems: There is no exact converse, but results conditional on some hypothesis. The field of divergent series, and their summation methods, contains many theorems of abelian type and of tauberian type.

See also

Further reading

  - Ahlfors called it Abel's limit theorem.

External links

  (a more general look at Abelian theorems of this type)
 
 

Theorems in real analysis
Theorems in complex analysis
Mathematical series
Niels Henrik Abel
Summability methods